For 3D computer graphics, the Tao Framework is a C# library giving .NET and Mono developers access to popular graphics and gaming libraries like OpenGL and SDL. It was originally developed by the C# OpenGL programmer Randy Ridge, and since its start many developers have contributed to the project. The latest version of Tao is version 2.1 released on May 1, 2008.

Tao Framework has been superseded by OpenTK.

In 2012, in parallel with the development of OpenTK, a new project called TaoClassic has been introduced on SourceForge, as a direct continuation of Tao Framework, with the same licensing conditions and design disciplines, but with new authors and cutting-edge features, like support for OpenGL 4.3, 64-bit operating systems, etc.

Bindings 
 Cg 2.0.0.0
 DevIL 1.6.8.3
 FFmpeg 0.4.9.0
 freeglut 2.4.0.2
 FreeType 2.3.5.0
 GLFW 2.6.0.0
 Lua 5.1.3.0
 ODE 0.9.0.0
 OpenAL 1.1.0.1
 OpenGL 2.1.0.12
 PhysFS 1.0.1.2
 SDL 1.2.13.0

References

External links 
 
 

3D graphics software
.NET software
Software using the MIT license